EPM–Scott is a Colombian professional cycling team. EPM–Scott participates in the UCI America Tour, which includes races like the 2011, and 2012 USA Pro Cycling Challenge.

Team roster

Doping
On 28 November 2017 news broke that Edward Díaz had tested positive for CERA at the 2017 Vuelta a Colombia.

Major wins

2007
 Road Race Championships, Fidel Chacón
 Time Trial Championships, Santiago Botero
Overall  Vuelta a Colombia, Santiago Botero
Prologue, Stages 6 & 14, Santiago Botero
2008
Overall  Vuelta a Colombia, Giovanny Báez
Stage 2, Jhon García
2009
Stage 11 Vuelta a Colombia, Giovanny Báez
2010
Stage 2 Vuelta a Cuba, Jaime Castañeda
Overall Volta de Gravatai, Jaime Castañeda
Stage 1, Julian Muñoz
Stage 2, Juan Pablo Suárez
Overall Tour de Santa Catarina, Edwar Ortiz
Stage 2, Edwar Ortiz
Stage 5, Giovanny Báez
Stage 2 Vuelta a Colombia, Jaime Castañeda
Stage 13 Vuelta a Colombia, Javier Alberto González
Overall  Vuelta a Guatemala, Giovanny Báez
Stages 2 & 3, Juan Pablo Suárez
Stages 7 & 9, Giovanny Báez
2011
Stage 6a Vuelta a la Independencia Nacional, Rafael Infantino
Stages 7 & 8 Vuelta a la Independencia Nacional, Jaime Castañeda
Stage 3 Vuelta a la Comunidad de Madrid, Giovanny Báez
Stage 1 Vuelta a Colombia, Walter Pedraza
Overall Tour do Rio, Juan Pablo Suárez
Stage 3, Juan Pablo Suárez
2012
Stage 9 Vuelta a la Independencia Nacional, Jaime Vergara
Overall  Vuelta a Guatemala, Ramiro Rincón
Stage 3, Freddy Piamonte
Stage 5, Isaac Bolivár
Stage 6, Javier Eduardo Gomez
Stage 7, Oscar Rivera
Overall Vuelta al Mundo Maya, Giovanny Báez
Stage 5, Giovanny Báez
2013
 Road Race Championships, Walter Pedraza
Overall  Vuelta a Colombia, Óscar Sevilla
Stage 1, Edwar Ortiz
Stage 4, Óscar Sevilla
Overall  Tour do Rio, Óscar Sevilla
Stage 1, Weimar Roldán
Stage 3, Camilo Castiblanco
Stage 4, Óscar Sevilla
2014
Stage 7 Tour do Brasil, Walter Pedraza
Overall  Vuelta a Colombia, Óscar Sevilla
Stage 1, Team time trial
Stage 3, Weimar Roldán
Stage 5, Óscar Sevilla
Overall  Tour do Rio, Óscar Sevilla
Stage 1, Óscar Sevilla
2015
Overall  Vuelta a la Independencia Nacional, Róbigzon Oyola
Stages 2 & 6, Jaime Castañeda
Overall  Vuelta a Colombia, Óscar Sevilla
Stage 1, Team time trial
Stage 8, Rafael Infantino
Stages 9 & 13 (ITT), Óscar Sevilla
Stage 11, Juan Pablo Suárez
Stage 1 Tour do Rio, Óscar Sevilla
Stage 3 Tour do Rio, Weimar Roldán
2016
 Team Time Trial Championships
Stage 1 (ITT) Vuelta a Colombia, Óscar Sevilla
Stage 12 Vuelta a Colombia, Juan Pablo Suárez
2017
Stage 1 Vuelta a Colombia, Team time trial
Stage 4 Vuelta a Colombia, Juan Pablo Suárez
2021
Stage 5 Vuelta a Colombia, Aldemar Reyes

National champions
2007
 Colombian Time Trial, Santiago Botero
 Colombian Road Race, Fidel Chacón
2013
 Colombian Road Race, Walter Pedraza
2016
 Colombian Team Time Trial

Notes

References

External links

UCI Continental Teams (America)
Cycling teams based in Colombia
Cycling teams established in 1999
1999 establishments in Colombia